Xyliphius lombarderoi is a species of banjo catfish endemic to Argentina where it occurs in the Paraná River basin.  It grows to a length of 9.9 cm.

References 
 

Aspredinidae
Freshwater fish of Argentina
Endemic fauna of Argentina
Fish described in 1964